The 1942 Cork Intermediate Hurling Championship was the 33rd staging of the Cork Intermediate Hurling Championship since its establishment by the Cork County Board in 1909.

Lough Rovers won the championship following a 3-05 to 3-02 defeat of Carrigtwohill in the final. This was their second championship title overall and their first title since 1933.

Results

Final

References

Cork Intermediate Hurling Championship
Cork Intermediate Hurling Championship